Medak Lok Sabha constituency is one of the 17 Lok Sabha (Lower House of the Parliament) constituencies in Telangana state in southern India.

Kotha Prabhakar Reddy of Telangana Rashtra Samithi is representing the constituency for the first time.

Overview
Since its inception in 1957 Medak seat is a Congress  stronghold, various political outfits like the Telangana Praja Samithi, Bharatiya Janata Party and the Telugu Desam Party have won it during different general elections.

After the formation of Telangana Rashtra Samithi the seat has been won by four different candidates in three general elections including its founder and current Chief Minister of Telangana K. Chandrashekar Rao and actress Vijayashanti

Assembly segments
Medak Lok Sabha constituency comprises the following Legislative Assembly segments:

Members of Parliament

Election results

General Election, 2019

General By-Election, 2014

General Election, 2014

General Election, 2009

General Election, 2004

Trivia
 Former Prime Minister Indira Gandhi was holding the seat when she was assassinated in 1984.
 Telangana first Chief Minister, Kalvakuntla Chandrashekar Rao won the seat by a margin of 3.7 lakh votes in 2014 General Election, but he later vacated it.

See also
 Medak district
 List of Constituencies of the Lok Sabha

References

External links
 Medak lok sabha  constituency election 2019 date and schedule

Lok Sabha constituencies in Telangana
Medak district